Kemp Morgan or Gib Morgan is a character from American folklore, particularly appearing in tall tales. 

Kemp Morgan stories are said to have appeared in the oil fields of Texas and Oklahoma, where he was a folk hero similar to Paul Bunyan or John Henry. Morgan was said to be a rotary oil driller with an amazing power of olfaction, allowing him to smell oil underground, and the strength to hand-build a drilling platform covering four acres at the base, and so tall "it had to be hinged in two places to let the moon go by".

Morgan is possibly a creation of fakelore, rather than a genuine folk hero.  In 1945, Texas folklorist Mody Coggin Boatright published a full-length analysis, Gib Morgan:  Minstrel of the Oil Fields, which linked the collected tales with a consistent pattern of biographical and historical details, and then to "a man of flesh and blood":  Gilbert Morgan (1842-1909), born in Callensburg, Pennsylvania, veteran of the American Civil War, and at work in the old fields for more than 20 years.

References 

Folklore of the Southern United States
Tall tales
Fakelore
Fictional characters from Oklahoma
Fictional characters from Texas
Petroleum production
People in the petroleum industry